Ahu Antmen Akiska (born 1971 in Mersin) is a Turkish writer, translator, academic and columnist. She got her degree between the years 1989-1994 at İstanbul Üniversitesi Faculty of Communications. Between the years 1994-1995, she completed her masters degree at the  University of London Goldsmiths College Department of Cultural Studies. She achieved her doctorate between the years 2002-2005 at the  Mimar Sinan Fine Arts University -Faculty of Arts and Sciences at the Art History Department. She works as a professor at the Marmara University Fine Arts Faculty; She gives lectures on 20th Century Art, Art Criticism and Theory, Contemporary Art Practice and Contemporary Turkish Art. At the same time she is also on duty as a professor at the Sabancı University  Art and Social Sciences Faculty. Antmen conducts research on issues such as; representations of cultural transitions, transformations and translations; use of the body as a sociopsychological tool in performance; gender inequality in art history;  self, identity and gender issues in modern and contemporary art and has organized exhibitions on these issues.

Works

Books 

 Aloş 1957 - 2007 Retrospektif/ Zamanların Belleği - Ali Teoman Germaner'in Yaşamı ve Sanatı (2007)
 Aloşname: Bir Heykeltıraşın Felsefe Taşı (2016)
 Kimlikli Bedenler (2017)
 Sanat/Cinsiyet Sanat Tarihi Ve Feminist Eleştiri (2020)
 20. Yüzyıl Batı Sanatında Akımlar (2019)

Translations 

 Ağırbaşlı İki Hanımefendi (1996), Jane Bowles
 Aşk Üzerine (2020), Alain De Botton
 Beyaz Küpün İçinde (2019), Brian O'doherty
 Dali (2005), Gilles Neret
 Gauguin (2005), İngo F. Walther
 Görmek ve Fark Etmek (2018), Alain De Botton
 İngiliz Casus (2020), Michael Ondaatje
 Kimsenin Konuşmadığı Dil (2002), Eugene Mirabelli
 Pablo Picasso/ Yüzyılın Dahisi (2005), İngo F. Walther
 Soluk Alma Dersleri (1993), Anne Tyler

Compilations 

 İçerdeki Yabancı - Hale Tenger (2007), Yapı Kredi Publications
 Türkiye Sanat Yıllığı 2001 (2002), Yapı Kredi Publications

Sources

External links 

 Sanat/Cinsiyet: Sanat Tarihi ve Feminist Eleştiri kitabının incelemeleri: The Journal of Academic Social Sciences , Sosyalist Feminist Kolektif 

Turkish columnists
Turkish translators
21st-century Turkish writers
20th-century Turkish writers
Living people
1971 births
People from Mersin
Turkish academics
Mimar Sinan Fine Arts University alumni
Alumni of the University of London
Alumni of Goldsmiths, University of London